The Shorter Oxford English Dictionary (SOED) is an English language dictionary published by the Oxford University Press.  The SOED is a two-volume abridgement of the twenty-volume Oxford English Dictionary (OED).

Print editions

Prequel
The first editor, William Little, worked on the book from 1902 until his death in 1922.  The dictionary was completed by H. W. Fowler, Jessie Coulson, and C. T. Onions. An abridgement of the complete work was contemplated from 1879, when the Oxford University Press took over from the Philological Society on what was then known as A New English Dictionary on Historical Principles.  However, no action was taken until 1902, when the work was begun by William Little, a fellow of Corpus Christi College, Oxford. He laboured until his death in 1922, at which point he had completed "A" to "T", and "V". The remaining letters were completed by H. W. Fowler ("U", "X", "Y", and "Z") and Mrs. E. A. Coulson (Jessie Coulson) ("W") under the direction of C. T. Onions, who succeeded Little as editor. Onions wrote that SOED was "to present in miniature all the features of the principal work" and to be "a quintessence of those vast materials" in the complete OED.

First edition
The first edition was published in February 1933. It was reprinted in March and April of that year and again in 1934.

Shorter Oxford English Dictionary/The Shorter Oxford English Dictionary on Historical Principles (Hardcover): 2 volumes.
?th impression (1933-??-??)
Shorter Oxford English Dictionary (Hardcover): 1 volume.
?th impression (1959-??-??)

Second edition
The second edition appeared in 1936, contained about 3,000 revisions and additions, and was reprinted in 1939.

Shorter Oxford English Dictionary on historical principles (Hardcover 2475 pages): Second edition 1 volume reprinted 1939.
Prepared by William Little, H. W.Fowler, J. Coulson
Revised and edited by C. T. Onions

Third edition
The third edition was published in the United States under the name The Oxford Universal Dictionary on Historical Principles in 1944 with reprints in 1947, 1950, 1952, and 1955.  The 1955 reprint contained an addendum of new entries. The 1973 reprint contained an enlarged addenda with over seventy pages and a major revision of all the etymologies.

Shorter Oxford English Dictionary (Hardcover)
1st? impression (1944-01-01)
The Shorter Oxford English Dictionary on Historical Principles (Third Edition, revised with addenda) (Hardcover) (ASIN B01N22ETM9): Includes addenda.
?th impression (1964-??-??)
?th impression (1968-??-??)
Shorter Oxford English Dictionary (Hardcover) (/): 1 volume.
1st? impression (1970-??-??)
Shorter Oxford English Dictionary (Hardcover) (/): 1 volume.
1st? impression (1973-11-??)
The Shorter Oxford English Dictionary on Historical Principles (Hardcover) (/)
?th impression (1973-11-22)
?th impression (1975-??-??)
The Shorter Oxford English Dictionary (Guild Publishing edition, Hardcover) (ASIN B00HLDC3M2)
?th impression (1985-??-??)

Fourth edition
The New SOED was prepared under the editorship of Lesley Brown 1980-1993 and was the first complete revision of the dictionary and should be considered a re-abridgement of the SOED and its supplements. The whole text was completely revised for the Fourth Edition, which was published in 1993 as the New Shorter Oxford English Dictionary.  The book attempted to include all English words which had substantial currency after 1700, plus the vocabulary of Shakespeare, John Milton, Edmund Spenser and the King James Version. As a historical dictionary, it includes obsolete words if they are used by major authors and earlier meanings where they explain the development of a word. Headwords are traced back to their earliest usage. Includes 97,600 headwords, 25,250 variant spellings, 500,000 definitions, 87,400 illustrative quotations and 7,333 sources of quotations (including 5,519 individual authors).
The New Shorter Oxford English Dictionary (Hardcover)
?th impression (1993-??-??)
The New Shorter Oxford English Dictionary thumb index edition (Hardcover) (/)
?th impression (1993-10-14)
The New Shorter Oxford English Dictionary luxury edition (Hardcover)
?th impression (1993-??-??)
The New Shorter Oxford English Dictionary leather bound edition
?th impression (1993-??-??)

Fifth edition
The fifth edition was published in 2002, and contains more than half a million definitions, with 83,500 illustrative quotations from 7,000 authors. The name Shorter Oxford English Dictionary was used to emphasize the link between this two-volume dictionary and the original twenty-volume OED.
Shorter Oxford English Dictionary Fifth Edition (Hardcover) (/)
?th impression (2002-12-31)
Shorter Oxford English Dictionary on CD-ROM Version 2.0 (/): 
?th impression (2003-01-09)

Sixth edition
On 21 September 2007, the sixth edition appeared. The dictionary now included 600,000 words, phrases, and definitions, covering global English-speaking regions and 2500 new words and meanings from Oxford Dictionaries and Oxford English Corpus. As previously, the vocabulary included entries in general English from 1700 to the present day and in earlier major literary works. The dictionary included 80,000 quotations illustrating the use of words, thousands of newly discovered antedatings based on the continuing research for the OED, 2,500 new words and senses, thousands of antedatings of existing words from Oxford English Dictionary and Oxford English Corpus, many new quotations from then-recent authors, and a complete review of spelling forms and defining vocabulary.

16,000 words lost their hyphen. Angus Stevenson, the editor of the Shorter OED, stated the reason: "People are not confident about using hyphens anymore, they're not really sure what they are for." Its researchers reviewed a corpus of 2 billion words (in newspapers, books, web sites and blogs from 2000). Bumble-bee is now bumblebee, ice-cream is ice cream and pot-belly is pot belly.

Shorter Oxford English Dictionary Sixth Edition (Hardcover) (/)
?th impression (2007-09-20)
Shorter Oxford English Dictionary Sixth Edition (Deluxe leather-bound Hardcover) (/)
?th impression (2007-09-20)
Shorter Oxford English Dictionary on CD-ROM Version 3.0 (/): Supports linking to word processors.
?th impression (2007-09-13)
Shorter Oxford English Dictionary Deluxe edition (hardcover+CD-ROM) (/):
?th impression (2007-09-20)
(The CD-ROM supports Windows 2000 or higher, Mac OS x 10.3.9 (PowerPC) or 10.4 or 10.5 (Intel) or higher).

Electronic versions
The Shorter Oxford English Dictionary is available on CD-ROM for Windows and Macintosh. Version 3.0 of that CD-ROM is copy-protected using SecuROM.

The dictionary is also available as an electronic download plug-in for WordWeb for Windows and for Mac OS X.

In addition to all of the contents of the traditional paper dictionary, the electronic versions include:
 Audio pronunciations
 Automatic look-up of words from other applications
 Search functions
 Crossword solver and anagram functions

Mac OS X version
Version 3.2 (OS X 10.9 64-bit, 2016-12-01)
Windows version: Published by MobiSystems, Inc.
Version 2.2.0.7 (Windows 8.1, 2015-??-??, 10-device installation)

References

External links
Oxford University Press page: 6th edition, Deluxe edition, CD-ROM 3.0
Microsoft Store page: 6th edition
iTunes page: Shorter Oxford English Dictionary
WordWeb pages: The Shorter Oxford English Dictionary (Windows)

1933 non-fiction books
Oxford dictionaries
Works derived from the Oxford English Dictionary